Albrandswaard is a municipality in the western Netherlands, in the province of South Holland.

The municipality of Albrandswaard consists of the village of Poortugaal in the west and Rhoon in the east. They were separate municipalities until 1985. The name was taken from the historic municipality of Albrandswaard en Kijvelanden, which existed until 1842, when it joined Poortugaal. Albrandswaard actually is a polder located between Rhoon and Poortugaal.

Both villages have a metro station on Rotterdam Metro line D (Poortugaal station and Rhoon station), which connect them to Rotterdam and to the main railway network from Rotterdam Centraal in the east, and to Hoogvliet and Spijkenisse in the west.

Topography

Topographic map of the municipality of Albrandswaard, Sept. 2014.

Notable people 
 Hendrik Swalmius (1577 in Rhoon – 1649), a theologian painted by Frans Hals 
 Eleazar Swalmius (1582 in Rhoon – 1652), a theologian painted by Rembrandt
 Mattheus Marinus Schepman (1847 in Rhoon – 1919), a malacologist 
 Hesterine de Reus (born 1961 in Poortugaal), a former soccer player and coach
 Alexander Pechtold (born 1965), a former politician and art historian; grew up in Rhoon 
 Sander Fischer (born 1988 in Rhoon), a professional footballer with over 300 club caps

Gallery

References

External links
Official website

 
Municipalities of South Holland
IJsselmonde (island)